Drennon Creek is a stream in Henry County, Kentucky, in the United States. It is a tributary of the Kentucky River.

Drennon Creek was named for Jacob Drennon, who explored the area in the 1770s.

See also
List of rivers of Kentucky

References

Rivers of Henry County, Kentucky
Rivers of Kentucky